Gece Yolcuları (literally "Night Riders" or "Night Travelers") is a Turkish soft rock band.

They established as a university band in 1993, working as amateurs till 1995, when they started their professional career. At first the main aim of the band was to compose and share their authentic music and to obtain a distinctive style. In 2004 they recorded their first album “Gece Yolculari” as a production of EMI/Turkey and made a great success with their first single “Unut Beni”. In 2005 that song was demanded to be a theme in Hayat Bilgisi, one of the most popular TV series in Turkey and after it had appeared on TV, it aroused a great interest all over the country. With the success of their television appearance, the band embarked a tour thanks to which they managed to play in front of thousands of fans, especially performing at universities and cities in Turkey. The band took part in many projects in the frame of their social responsibilities and appeared one of these projects having been held for the survivors in tsunami disaster in South Asia “Hand in Hand for South Asia“ in 2005. They made music videos for the songs in the first album “Yaban Gülü” and “Ölüm de Var” and they were on lists for a long time. The video “Yaban Gülü” was broadcast on MTV Europe and aroused interest. In late 2005, they accorded TMC and in 2006 they released “Gece Yolculari 2” with Cem Özkan who was at the same time the producer of the first album. The first single of the second album was “Neredesin”. “Gece Yolculari” proved how the style of the band was stable and open to improve and with the success of this album Gece Yolculari was up on the lists and the agenda again. The second video of the album “Seninle Bir Dakika” won everybody’s approval with its sound and the harmonization. The third video “Hüzün” was up on the lists for months as an indicator of the band’s being permanent. People found the last video of this album “Gökler Agliyor” successful as a love ballad. During Gece Yolculari 2, the band went on a tour and met their fans and saw their success. Apart from the album, they got on in the music with the other projects. For instance, they made “BABEYLI” in association with Ramiz for a film by Ö. Faruk Sorak “SINAV” which criticised Turkish Education System. In addition, “Babeyli” was the first attempt of a 9/8 rap song in Turkey and an authentic rock-rap performance, it was also the first soundtrack of the band. The band made a march for Fenerbahçe’s 100th anniversary, they also composed Trabzonspor 40th March. They released their third album on February 14, 2008. The first single of this album is “Deger mi” by Aysel Gürel and Onno Tunç.

On 1 January 2009 Gece Yolcuları members decided to carry on their music careers individually. Bülent Albayrak, Yasin Arslantürkoğlu and Murat Arslantürkoğlu left the group but Edis İlhan and Uğur Arslantürkoğlu decided to carry on with the same name. They released their first music video with their new members, Yıldızlarlayım (I am with stars) and kept on performing. Gece Yolcuları released their fourth studio album, "Neden" (Why) in 26 February 2013 .

Group Members 
 Edis İlhan - Vocals, Percussion
 Uğur Arslantürkoğlu - Rhythm guitar, Back vocals
 Volkan F.Yılmaz - Drums
 Semih Keçeci - Bass guitar
 Umut yıldız - Solo guitar

Albums 
 Gece Yolcuları (2004)
 Gece Yolcuları 2 (2006)
 Kalbin Kadar Yakın (2008)
 GC2010 (2010)

External links 
 Official website of the band  
  Official Facebook Fanpage of the band 

Turkish rock music groups
Musical groups from Istanbul
Soft rock music groups
Musical groups established in 1995